German submarine U-825 was a Type VIIC U-boat built for Nazi Germany's Kriegsmarine for service during World War II.
She was laid down on 19 July 1943 by Schichau-Werke, Danzig as yard number 1588, launched on 16 February 1944 and commissioned on 4 May 1944 under Oberleutnant zur See Gerhard Stoelker.

Design
German Type VIIC submarines were preceded by the shorter Type VIIB submarines. U-825 had a displacement of  when at the surface and  while submerged. She had two shafts and two  propellers.

U-825 was fitted with five  torpedo tubes (four fitted at the bow and one at the stern), fourteen torpedoes, one  SK C/35 naval gun, (220 rounds), one  Flak M42 and two twin  C/30 anti-aircraft guns. The boat had a complement of between forty-four and sixty.

Service history
The boat's career began with training at 8th Flotilla on 4 May 1944, followed by active service on 1 December 1944 as part of the 11th Flotilla.

Wolfpacks
U-825 took part in no wolfpacks.

Fate
U-825 surrendered on 13 May 1945 at Loch Eriboll.

Summary of raiding history

References

Bibliography

External links

German Type VIIC submarines
1944 ships
U-boats commissioned in 1944
U-boats sunk in 1946
World War II submarines of Germany
Ships built in Danzig
Operation Deadlight
World War II shipwrecks in the Atlantic Ocean
Ships built by Schichau
Maritime incidents in 1946